Fattigdommens forbandelse (The Curses of Poverty) is a Norwegian silent film that premiered at the Kosmorama Theater in Kristiania (now Oslo) on October 7, 1911.

The film is considered the first Norwegian feature film, and was also announced as "the first Norwegian art film" (Den første norske kunstfilm). It was directed by Halfdan Nobel Roede, who also directed the films Under forvandlingens lov (1911), Alt for Norge (1912), and Hemmeligheden  (1912).

The film is considered lost, and so its exact content is not known, but the film was described as a "a mini-drama on the shady side of life in three acts" (minodrama paa Livets Skyggeside i 3 Akter). The indoor scenes were filmed at Riis farm in Vestre Aker. The outdoor scene was partly filmed in Son and partly elsewhere.

References

External links
 
 Fattigdommens forbandelse at Norsk filmografi

1911 films
Norwegian drama films
Norwegian black-and-white films
Norwegian silent films
1911 drama films
Lost Norwegian films
1911 lost films
Silent drama films